Øvrebygd is a small village in Bjerkreim municipality in Rogaland county, Norway. Ivesdal Chapel is located in this village.

References

Villages in Rogaland
Bjerkreim